Bukowina  is a village in the administrative district of Gmina Ulanów, within Nisko County, Subcarpathian Voivodeship, in south-eastern Poland. The village is located in the historical region Galicia. After partition of Poland the village was under Austrian Habsburg rule. The border checkpoint from tzarist Russia and Austria-Hungary days has been reconstructed in the nearby forest.

World War I historic cemetery is located in Bukowina. 96 soldiers of various nationalities who died in 1914 and 1915 have been buried there.

References

Bukowina